Xavier University – Ateneo de Cagayan (Filipino: Pamantasang Ateneo de Cagayan; Spanish: Universidad Ateneo de Cagayan), also known simply as the Ateneo de Cagayan or Xavier is a private, Catholic, coeducational, research basic and higher education institution. Xavier is operated by the Philippine Province of the Society of Jesus in Cagayan de Oro, Misamis Oriental, Philippines. Founded in 1933 as the Ateneo de Cagayan, it became the first higher education institution in Mindanao to receive a university status a year before its sister school Ateneo de Manila. It was given its present name in honor of the Jesuit missionary St. Francis Xavier.

The university offers primary and secondary education as well as undergraduate and post-graduate education in humanities, social sciences, engineering, management and business. It offers professional degrees through graduate schools such as Xavier Ateneo College of Law and Jose P. Rizal School of Medicine.

Prominent figures such as the late President Carlos P. Garcia and late President Corazon Aquino were among the people who were conferred an honorary degree by the university. PDP-Laban President Jose Alvarez is among the most notable alumni of the university. The named "Top 100 Most Powerful Women in the World"  by The Australian: Ex-senator Miriam Defensor Santiago, was among the distinguished politician who was conferred by the school as well. The former Vice President Teofisto Guingona Jr. is among the notable alumnus of the university. Filipino singer and songwriter Arthur Nery is a notable alumnus as well. Filipino author Jonahmae Panen Pacala also known by her pseudonym as Jonaxx, is also a notable alumna of the university.

The institution earned the spot in the Quacquarelli Symonds Asia University Rankings among 14 other universities in the Philippines. It is regarded as one of the top-ranked private university in the country with a thorough-selective admission.

History

Beginnings

In 1933, an American Jesuit missionary Fr. James T. G. Hayes, S.J., founded Xavier University – Ateneo de Cagayan as the Ateneo de Cagayan. Fr. James T. G. Hayes, S.J., later became the first Bishop and Archbishop of Cagayan de Oro. The school was first located at Burgos Street by the former St. Augustine Parochial School, and began with 17 first-year students.

The city of Cagayan de Oro, then called Cagayan de Misamis, which had a population of around 50,000 years ago, was a major port town with fast-growing population. The school grew with the community, opening college courses in June 1938 and Grades 5 to 7 in June 1940, accommodating students from Mindanao and the Visayas.

World War II and rebuilding

Ateneo de Cagayan then moved to its present location along Corrales Avenue and grew into a college, offering courses in Liberal Arts, Education, and Commerce.

On December 9, 1941, with only 614 students, the school temporarily closed down on May 2, 1942. It housed the headquarters of the Imperial Japanese Army in Mindanao.

On September 9, 1944, U.S. Air Force bombings reduced most of Cagayan to rubble, along with the school. Then-rector Fr. Edward J. Haggerty, S.J., became chaplain to the advancing Visayas-Mindanao Force while serving as an advisor in Fertig's guerrilla government. He and his successor, Fr. Andrew F. Cervini, S.J., rebuilt the school, and regular classes resumed by 1946.

After the eruption of Mt. Hibok-Hibok in Camiguin on August 30, 1947, the campus housed refugees inside the gymnasium and even sponsored a boxing match to raise funds for the survivors.

University status
Rector Fr. Francisco Z. Araneta, S.J., had vowed to St. Francis Xavier that if Ateneo de Cagayan was granted university status before its commencement exercises on March 22, 1958, he would rename it after the saint. An hour before the commencement exercises, then-Secretary of Education Manuel Lim sent a telegram stating that Ateneo de Cagayan now had university status.
On August 27, 1958, it was inaugurated as a university and officially became Xavier University – Ateneo de Cagayan. It became the first higher education institution in Mindanao to receive university status, a year before its sister school, the Ateneo de Manila. At the inauguration banquet, President Carlos P. Garcia received the first honorary degree conferred by the university.

Campuses

Xavier University – Ateneo de Cagayan operates on four campuses: 
 The eight-hectare main campus in the heart of Cagayan de Oro, where the undergraduate and graduate academic units are located;
 The 50-hectare Manresa Complex in front of SM City Cagayan de Oro, which is used as the experimental and demonstration farms and extension works of the College of Agriculture, as well as the headquarters of SEARSOLIN, an outreach unit of the university; it also houses the Jose Chavez Alvarez Technology Complex of the Andrew L. Gotianun Sr. Center for Integrated Technologies;
 The 13-hectare basic education campus in Pueblo de Oro where the grade school, junior high school, and senior high school departments are based, as well as the university's sports complex; the grade school used to have another campus in Barangay Macasandig before it finally closed in late 2021; and
 The Maria Reyna Xavier University Hospital in Barangay Camaman-an (jointly run by Xavier, the Archdiocese of Cagayan de Oro, and the Sisters of Saint Paul of Chartres), which also serves as the training hospital for nursing and medicine students.

Campus of the Future project
In 2017, the institution proposed the ₱2.1 billion peso plan of the 21-hectare expansion project the Campus of the Future which would sell at least 4 hectares of its 6-hectare downtown campus and another 14-hectares of a 63-hectare agricultural property in Cagayan de Oro. “First-class education needs first-class building and campus design.” Xavier Ateneo President Fr. Mars P. Tan stated.

Cagayan de Oro Mayor Oscar Moreno also hailed the plan, saying the plan would “redefine” and change the landscape of Northern Mindanao's capital city. However, there has been some opposition from alumni and retired faculty and staff, citing long-term traffic issues in the uptown area, as well as the heritage status of the main campus.

In line with this, the Provincial Superior of the Jesuits in the Philippines, Fr. Primitivo E. Viray, S.J., endorsed the plan to the Superior General of the Society of Jesus in Rome, the Very Rev. Arturo A. Sosa, S.J., whom gave the green-light to endorsed the plan to the Vatican for its approval.

In 2021, the Vatican has finally given its seal of approval for the Campus of the Future project of Xavier University – Ateneo de Cagayan. "The long wait for the final decision only showed the amount of time devoted by the Church authorities to review and study the project." in a statement said.

Governance

The university is governed by a Board of Trustees, led by Francisco F. Guerra III as the chairman. Fr. Mars P. Tan, S.J., University President since July 31, 2020, is a member of the Board.

As one of six Jesuit colleges and universities in the Philippines, Xavier Ateneo also forms a consortium with the other two Jesuit universities in Mindanao, namely: Ateneo de Davao University and Ateneo de Zamboanga University.

Academics

In addition to the courses being offered by the university, there are programs specifically designed to train "engaged citizens and effective leaders". These include a first-year course in Ignatian spirituality, social exposure and reflection as part of the course curriculum. A second-year course fulfills the requirement for community service experience, on a weekly basis. Also, at least four courses in theology and in philosophy are required, with Muslim students allowed to study their own religious tradition.

Professional schools

Graduate school
The Graduate School offers the university's post-baccalaureate programs, through doctoral studies. Its council is the Graduate School Student Council.

College of Law
The College of Law offers a Juris Doctor program. Its student council is the Association of Law Students. Its team is called Legis and its mascot is the goddess Dike (Lady Justice).

Studies are both history and research-oriented, and offer legal aid for the marginalized members of society.

Its curriculum is designed to widen and deepen appreciation and understanding of the history and development of law and to encourage continuing education and research consistent with the nature of the field. Together with the Xavier University Center for Legal Assistance, students of the College of Law provide legal and paralegal assistance to marginalized members of society. Early on, they are exposed to litigation, consultation and counseling, which enable them to develop a logical and analytical mind, uphold high ethical standards, and possess a mastery of communication skills vital in effective law practice.

The College of Law aspires to attain superior performance and service. Its students have won in national and international moot court competitions and law debates. It has produced graduates who are nationally distinguished law practitioners, corporate counsels, policy makers, local chief executives, and judiciary officials.

On November 11, 2011, the college was named an "Outstanding Law School" by the Legal Education Board of the Supreme Court of the Philippines, and it was recognized as being one of the ten best-performing law schools in the Philippines from 2001 to 2011. A plaque was presented to its dean, Atty. Raul R. Villanueva, as outstanding law dean. On the 2015 bar exam the school ranked seventh among law-schools-with-20-examinees-or-more, and one examinee came in eighth.

Dr. Jose P. Rizal School of Medicine
The Dr Jose P Rizal School of Medicine is housed in a five-storey building located at the east side of Xavier Ateneo campus. The Medical Library with 5,000 volumes and 256 journals is the Mindanao repository for World Health Organization publications.

Founded in 1983, the medical school has Level 3 Accredited Status from the Philippine Accrediting Association of Schools, Colleges and Universities, while being acknowledged by the Commission on Higher Education as a Center of Development in Medical Education, and was recognized by the Professional Regulations Commission and the Board of Medicine for having ranked second in the national Physician Licensure Examination over 11 consecutive years. The school was chosen by the Philippine Council for Health Research and Development as a satellite medical institution for its project on the development of research capabilities.

Undergraduate schools

College of Agriculture
The College of Agriculture was founded in 1954. Its student council is the Agriculture or Aggies Student Council. They are known by the monikers 'Aggies' and 'Bullriders', and its mascot is the bull. Program offerings include Agribusiness, Agricultural Engineering, Food Technology, Development Communication, and Agriculture with majors in agricultural economics, animal science, and crop science.

The college pursues an integrated program of instruction, research, extension, and production to educate students in sustainable agriculture and other relevant technologies and in equitable access to resources in the context of "global liberalization" and "grassroots people participation." Manresa Farm offers research, outreach, and production opportunities, which are supplemented by team-building and ongoing faculty development. Opportunities include immersion in communities and internships with companies and organizations.

On February 27, 2009, Commission on Higher Education (CHED) declared Xavier Ateneo Center of Development in Agriculture for three years, the first private institution given this designation. In December 2015, it was declared as a Center of Excellence in Agriculture. In November 2009, CHED declared Xavier a National Center of Excellence, specifically a Provincial Institute for Agriculture (PIA) under the National Agriculture and Fisheries Education System. As a PIA, Xavier is among the priority partners of CHED in implementing development projects in agriculture.

Xavier Ateneo qualifies for a ₱500,000 grant to fund scholarships, continuing agriculture education programs, instructional materials development, and upgrading of facilities including research laboratories, among other priority projects supported by CHED. The college has Level III PAASCU accreditation valid until May 2020. The college has produced five topnotchers and over 50 top-10 finishers on the agriculture licensure examination.

College of Arts and Sciences
The College of Arts and Sciences, with more than 160 on the faculty, offers most of the university's core subjects, e.g., Filipino, English, humanities, natural and social sciences. Its student council is the United Arts and Sciences Student Council. Its mascot is the Tiger.

Its linkages with Local Government Units sustain its Coastal Research Management and strengthen its research and extension network. The Office of International Cooperation and Networking negotiates with foreign universities for international linkages. The Arts and Sciences programs of the university are PAASCU Level IV accredited with its Literature and Biology programs declared as a CHED Center of Development. Program offerings include:

Arts
 Economics
 Political Science
 English Language
 Filipino
 History
 Interdisciplinary Studies
 International Studies
 Literature
 Philosophy
 Psychology
 Sociology-Anthropology

Sciences
 Biology
 Chemistry
 Marine Biology
 Mathematics
 Psychology

College of Computer Studies

The College of Computer Studies (CCS), founded in 2011, offers programs in Computer Science, in Information Systems and in Information Technology. Its council is the Computer Studies Student Council and its mascot the Wizard.

It was included in the first batch of Centers of Development for Excellence in Information Technology Education (CODE-IT) by CHED and its BS in Computer Science received Level II accreditation from PAASCU. It strives to remain abreast of local and international standards and regulatory requirements through an ISO9001/IWA 2 "Guidelines for the Application of ISO 9001: 2000 in Education" alignment initiative.

The CCS maintains partnerships and linkages with other academic, industry, and government institutions to augment its instruction, research, and social outreach capabilities and to enhance the delivery of its curricular offerings. For instance, it has been a long-time partner and training provider of the SMART Schools/Microsoft Partners in Learning Program – a collaborative project of SMART, Microsoft, PBSP, DepEd that provides service to the community through IT training programs for public schools.

College of Engineering
The College of Engineering was founded in 1979 with 374 students and specialties in chemical, civil, electrical, and mechanical engineering. Of this first class only 51 graduated in 1984, 30 of these in civil engineering. Programs in electronics and industrial engineering were added in 1993, and the Masters in Engineering after 1995. In 2015 the pass rate ranged from 73% in electrical to 100% in mechanical engineering. All the programs are PAASCU Level II accredited and all but industrial engineering are CHED Centers of Development.

The College of Engineering student council is the Association of the College of Engineering Students. Its mascot is the Warrior symbolized by Lapu-Lapu.

Undergraduate Program Offerings

 Chemical Engineering
 Civil Engineering
 Electrical Engineering
 Electronics Engineering
 Industrial Engineering
 Mechanical Engineering

College of Nursing
The College of Nursing was founded in 1989 and was recognized by the Commission on Higher Education in 1992. The first batch in 1993 had a 100% passing rate in the Integrated Nurses Licensure Examination. The four-year Bachelor of Science in Nursing Program is community and prevention oriented. Students engage in basic sanitation activities in the community such as the regular free circumcisions in barangays and community fora on health issues.

From 2013 through 2016 Xavier Ateneo, with about 150 nurses per year, had a 100% passing rate on the licensure exam, and has been ranked second among large nursing schools in the Philippines.

Its student council is the Council of Nursing Students, and its mascot is the Python.

School of Business and Management
The School of Business and Management (formerly 'College of Commerce') is a recognized Center of Excellence with programs in accountancy, real estate management, and business administration (majors in business economics, financial management, marketing management). The Student Entrepreneurship Program is focused on entrepreneurial values, business ethics, environmental stewardship, and corporate social responsibility.

In the 2016 CPA exams, XU ranked sixth nationwide, and from its first class in Real Estate Management 17 of 19 received a passing grade. Its Accountancy and Business & Administration programs are PAASCU Level IV re-accredited, valid until May 2019.

Its student council is the School of Business and Management Student Council. Its mascot is the Eagle. SBM is the most populous college unit in the university.

School of Education
The School of Education was founded in 1938 and reopened in 1947; it trains science, math, and English teachers. The Ignatian Pedagogical Paradigm is used in teaching. Student internships in educational institutions in the region begin as early as sophomore year. Its student council is the Teachers' Guild. Its mascot is the Phoenix.

The school holds a Level III Re-accredited Status granted by PAASCU. CHED has the School of Education as a Center of Excellence. The elementary and secondary education programs are both PAASCU Level IV re-accredited and as a Center of Training Institution for the Department of Education's Certificate and In-Service Education and Training (INSET) Programs.

Andrew L Gotianun Sr. Center for Integrated Technologies
Unlike the other colleges, the Andrew L. Gotianun Sr. Center for Integrated Technologies (ALGCIT – formerly Center for Industrial Technology) is a technical-vocational school. Its student council is the Center for Integrated Technologies Student Council. Its mascot is the Knight.

Students are involved in entrepreneurial and industrial work. ALGCIT is recognized by the Technical Education and Skills Development Authority (TESDA) and in 1999 recognized by TESDA as a Center for Excellence in Industrial Technician Education. The center offers four three-year programs based on TESDA training regulations. Students who complete the programs are eligible to take the TESDA National Certificate examinations for the qualifications embedded in each program.

ALGCIT was housed at the main campus at Corrales Avenue until 2012 when it moved to the Jose Ch. Alvarez Technology Complex in the Manresa campus. The old ALGCIT building was renamed Faber Hall (from St. Peter Faber, co-founder of the Society of Jesus) and is used by the Colleges of Nursing and of Computer Studies. Presently, it is gearing to be the home of the Technical-Vocational track of the senior high school.

Basic education schools

Preparatory and Grade school
The preparatory and grade school campuses are located in Pueblo de Oro. The former preparatory and grade school campus in Macasandig was shut down in 2021 as part of the plan of integrating all basic education campuses from Preparatory to Senior High School in Pueblo de Oro.

Junior high school
Besides preparatory and grade school, the Ateneo offers secondary education. Formerly, the high school was located in the main campus at Corrales Avenue, but was relocated to a separate campus in Pueblo de Oro together with the grade school levels.

Senior high school
With the full implementation of the K-12 Basic Education Program, XU started offering Senior High School in the school year 2016–2017 with both Academic and Technical-Vocational tracks. Under the Academic Track are Accountancy and Business Management (ABM), General Academic (GA), Humanities and Social Studies (HUMSS), and Science, Technology, Engineering, and Mathematics (STEM). The students enrolled in the Academic Track are temporarily housed in the Agriculture and SBM Buildings at the main campus, while the students of the Technical-Vocational Track are in the Jose Chavez Alvarez Technology Complex in uptown Cagayan de Oro, beside the Manresa Farm.

School Library 
The University Libraries counts 14 libraries and sections in its system.
 Libraries: Management and Accountancy, Current Books Collection; Agriculture; Engineering; Nursing; Computer Studies; CIT Manresa; Audio Visual Collection; Reserved Collection; General Works Collection
 Professional Libraries: Law Program; Medical; Graduate Studies
 Special Collections: Research and Social Outreach Collection; American Corner Collection; Fr Miguel Bernad SJ Memorabilia Collection; Judge Ernesto Melferrari's Collection; Xavieriana Collection; Thesis & Dissertation; Filipiniana and Serials Collection; Education USA Center; World Bank Knowledge Development Center
 Facilities: Quiet Zone-Quiet Study Area (2nd Floor, Annex & Main Bldg); Discussion Room (5th Floor Annex Building); Internet Laboratory; Audio Visual Room 1; Audio Visual Room-CIT Manresa; Conference Room; AC Lecture Room

Linkages and resource sharing 
XU Library is a member of the Jesuit Higher Education Institutions Library Consortium (JHELCon), which includes: Ateneo de Davao University, Ateneo de Manila University, Ateneo de Naga University, Ateneo de Zamboanga University, Loyola College of Culion, Loyola School of Theology, and St. John Vianney Theological Seminary as members.

Its main purpose is to use group purchasing power, as for licensing digital resources and to purchase a common library system for all members when resources become available; to provide access to and share information resources held across all the member libraries; to provide support and training for its members; and to share best practices in providing information services to its users.

The American Corner has been active and effective in providing current and useful information including, but not limited to: education, economics, management, business, American studies, literature, English teaching, English language, politics, law, and democratic societies.

The library participates in the Consortium of Engineering Libraries in the Philippines (CELPhi). The aim is to allow participating libraries to share resources on-line and provide better access to the shared collection at lower cost; to upgrade the professional and personal competencies of its members; to share information on professional issues, best practices, and appropriate technical services.

The library is also a member of the International Federation of Library Associations and Institutions, the global voice of the library and information profession and the facilitator of cooperation.

The library participates in the Directory of Open Access Journals which facilitates access to scientific and scholarly journals, also guaranteeing quality control of content.

The library participates in "Kultura link: Libraries for Culture and the Arts," a project of the National Committee on Libraries and Information Services, in collaboration with the National Commission for Culture and the Arts.  It links libraries with culture and arts collections through collaborative and networking strategies among the cultural agencies and university-based libraries.

The library is also a member of the Academic Libraries Book Acquisition Systems Association, Inc., a non-profit organization that facilitates purchasing and cooperative activities among members.

The library has been a part of Academic Libraries Information Network in Mindanao since its founding in 1988 for the improvement of library services of its members, with network-wide access a key element.

School church
Being a Catholic school, Xavier University – Ateneo de Cagayan has a church on campus. Its full name is the University Church of the Immaculate Conception of the Blessed Virgin Mary. Despite its name, however, it is not a full parish church because its only service is funeral masses for deceased university staff.

The Holy Mass is celebrated daily in this church and streamed live via their Facebook page.

Notable people

See also
 Cagayan de Oro
 Southeast Asia Rural Social Leadership Institute
 Northern Mindanao
 List of Jesuit educational institutions in the Philippines
 Xavier School
 List of Jesuit sites

References

External links
 Xavier University Official Website
 Xavier University Libraries
 The Crusader Publication
 The Crusader Yearbook
 Ateneo Network

Jesuit universities and colleges in the Philippines
Educational institutions established in 1933
Nursing schools in the Philippines
Business schools in the Philippines
Graduate schools in the Philippines
Legal education in the Philippines
Liberal arts colleges in the Philippines
Medical schools in the Philippines
1933 establishments in the Philippines
Universities and colleges in Cagayan de Oro
Schools in Cagayan de Oro